The Department of Energy and Mines is a part of the Government of New Brunswick. It is charged with the administration of New Brunswick's energy policy including electricity, natural gas and refined petroleum products; as well as the regulation of the development and exploration of minerals from New Brunswick's land.

The department was established as the Department of Energy on June 27, 2003 when it was separated from the former Department of Natural Resources and Energy. In October 2012, it added further responsibilities from Natural Resources governing mines and minerals and its name was changed accordingly.

In a 2016 cabinet shuffle, the Department of Natural Resources and Department of Energy and Mines rejoined to form the new Department of Energy and Resource Development.

Ministers

External links
Department of Energy and Mines

Energy and Mines
New Brunswick
Subnational mining ministries